Creuzier-le-Neuf is a commune in the Allier department in central France.

Geography

Location 
Creuzier-le-Neuf is located 9 kilometers north of Vichy which it is a part of the agglomeration and about 20 km from Varennes-sur-Allier and Lapalisse.

Transportation 
It is accessible by the route nationale (RN) 209 from Varennes-sur-Allier and Moulins, route départementale (RD) 67 (Vichy bypass) from suburban districts located on the left bank, RD 907 from Lapalisse, RD 77 from Saint-Germain-des-Fossés, RD 558 and RD 174.

Carpool area has been created with the participation of the community of agglomeration of Vichy Val d'Allier and the General Council of Allier. It is part of the Community scheme areas carpooling.

Administration 
List of successive mayors:
 1965-2008: André Buissonniere
 2008-2014: Jean-Pierre Mongaret
 2014-2020: Léopold Nunez
 2020–2026: Thierry Laplace

Population

Culture & Heritage 

 Classic vintage home in Celzat
 Chermont ruined castle of the 18th century
 Saint-Front Church of the 11th and 12th centuries, rebuilt in the 19th century
 Gothic chapel Chermont
 Banks of Mourgon

See also
Communes of the Allier department

References

Communes of Allier
Allier communes articles needing translation from French Wikipedia